Frank Green (1861–1954) was a British industrialist.

Frank Green may also refer to:
 Sir Frank Green, 1st Baronet, (1835-1902), Lord Mayor of London 1900
 Frank Green (footballer) (born 1905), English footballer
 Frank A. Green (1860-1937), American farmer and politician
 Frank William Green (1876–1953), Canadian physician and politician
 Franklin Green (born 1933), American sport shooter, known as Frank
 Frankie Green (1918-1974), British ice hockey player

See also 
 Francis Green (disambiguation)
 Frank Greene (disambiguation)